A corsetmaker is a specialist tailor who makes corsets. Corsetmakers are frequently known by the French equivalent terms corsetier (male) and corsetière (female). Staymaker is an obsolete name for a corsetmaker.

Design and distribution

The best corsetmakers are highly skilled tailors with a knowledge of anatomy that enables them to make well-fitting, long-lasting corsets. Corsetmakers who reproduce historical styles must be familiar with historical fashions and costumes that span centuries of history. Individual corsetmakers often favour a certain style, and frequently have differing theories and opinions about the physical impact and benefits of various corsets, thereby influencing their corset design and creation.

The main consideration of corset design is duration of use. For short-term use, e.g. used for a special event such as a wedding, a corset will be worn briefly and so is not subject to wear, therefore need not be of the highest quality of construction. For long-term use, e.g., by tightlacing or waist training, corsets must be made to exact standards and are best custom-fitted and designed for the individual wearer. Single weakness or flaws tend to be visible. Some custom-made gowns have corsets built into the design; a talented dressmaker may also be a skilled corset-maker.

Some companies had travelling saleswomen, corsetières who ordered the tailored corsets from the company. Well-known are Spirella (1904–1989), Barcley, and Spenser.

Notable corsetmakers
Roxey Ann Caplin - British writer and inventor
Catherine Allsop Griswold - a Connecticut corsetmaker who held 30 patents, the most of any woman in America at the time.
Thomas Paine - American political activist, philosopher, political theorist, and revolutionary

See also

Corset
History of corsets
Hourglass corset
Tightlacing

References

Books
 Doyle R. (1997)Waisted Efforts, An Illustrated Guide To Corset Making. Nova Scotia, Sartorial Press Publications, 
 Tight Linings and Boning Mary Brooks Picken, 1920
 The Practical Corsetiere Mme Ruth A. Rosenfeld 1933
 The Basics Of Corset Building, A Handbook For Beginners by Linda Sparks (Author) 
 Caplin - Health and Beauty (1864)

Corsetry
Artisans